Richard de Camville (died 1191) was an English crusader knight, and one of Richard the Lionheart's senior commanders during the Third Crusade. In June 1190, at Chinon, he was, with three others, put in charge of King Richard's fleet sailing for the Holy Land. In 1191, he was appointed governor of Cyprus, jointly with Robert of Thornham. He died later in the same year at the Siege of Acre.

He was the son of Richard de Camville (died 1176), an Anglo-Norman landowner, and Millicent de Rethel (daughter of Gervais, Count of Rethel, and kinswoman (second cousin) of Adeliza of Louvain, the second wife of King Henry I). 

The family probably originated from Canville-les-Deux-Églises (Canvilla 1149, Camvilla 1153) in Normandy. He had at least one daughter, Isabel, wife of Robert de Harcourt.

In England, his holdings included land at Stanton Harcourt, in Oxfordshire, Blackland, in Wiltshire, and Speen (possibly posthumously) and Avington, both in Berkshire.

Family tree

 Richard de Camville of Warwickshire (c. 1110 – bef. 1176) married Millicent de Rethel
 Gerard (c. 1132 – 1214) married Nicholaa de la Haye
 Richard (c. 1178 – 1226) married Eustacia Basset
 Idonea (c. 1210 – 1252) married William II Longespee 
 Richard (c. 1135 – 1191) married Margaret
 Isabel (c. 1153 – aft. 1212) married Robert de Harcourt
 Maud (c. 1138) married William de Ros
 William (c. 1142 – c.1208) married Albreda Marmion
 Geoffrey (c. 1182) married Felicia
 Felicia (c. 1220) married Philip Durvassal
 Roger (c. 1145)
 Walter (c. 1148)
 Maud (c. 1173) married Thomas de Astley

References

External links
 http://www.geneajourney.com/camvil.html

12th-century English people
Christians of the Third Crusade
1191 deaths
Year of birth unknown